{{DISPLAYTITLE:GABAA receptor}}

The GABAA receptor (GABAAR) is an ionotropic receptor and ligand-gated ion channel. Its endogenous ligand is γ-aminobutyric acid (GABA), the major inhibitory neurotransmitter in the central nervous system. Upon opening, the GABAA receptor on the postsynaptic cell is selectively permeable to chloride ions (Cl−) and, to a lesser extent, bicarbonate ions (HCO3−). Depending on the membrane potential and the ionic concentration difference, this can result in ionic fluxes across the pore. If the membrane potential is higher than the equilibrium potential (also known as the reversal potential) for chloride ions, when the receptor is activated Cl− will flow into the cell. This causes an inhibitory effect on neurotransmission by diminishing the chance of a successful action potential occurring at the postsynaptic cell. The reversal potential of the GABAA-mediated inhibitory postsynaptic potential (IPSP) in normal solution is −70 mV, contrasting the GABAB IPSP (-100 mV).

The active site of the GABAA receptor is the binding site for GABA and several drugs such as muscimol, gaboxadol, and bicuculline. The protein also contains a number of different allosteric binding sites which modulate the activity of the receptor indirectly. These allosteric sites are the targets of various other drugs, including the benzodiazepines, nonbenzodiazepines, neuroactive steroids, barbiturates, alcohol (ethanol), inhaled anaesthetics, kavalactones, cicutoxin, and picrotoxin, among others.

GABAA receptors occur in all organisms that have a nervous system. To a limited extent the receptors can be found in non-neuronal tissues. Due to their wide distribution within the nervous system of mammals they play a role in virtually all brain functions.

Target for benzodiazepines 
The ionotropic GABAA receptor protein complex is also the molecular target of the benzodiazepine class of tranquilizer drugs. Benzodiazepines do not bind to the same receptor site on the protein complex as the endogenous ligand GABA (whose binding site is located between α- and β-subunits), but bind to distinct benzodiazepine binding sites situated at the interface between the α- and γ-subunits of α- and γ-subunit containing GABAA receptors. While the majority of GABAA receptors (those containing α1-, α2-, α3-, or α5-subunits) are benzodiazepine sensitive, there exists a minority of GABAA receptors (α4- or α6-subunit containing) which are insensitive to classical 1,4-benzodiazepines, but instead are sensitive to other classes of GABAergic drugs such as neurosteroids and alcohol. In addition peripheral benzodiazepine receptors exist which are not associated with GABAA receptors. As a result, the IUPHAR has recommended that the terms "BZ receptor", "GABA/BZ receptor" and "omega receptor" no longer be used and that the term "benzodiazepine receptor" be replaced with "benzodiazepine site".

In order for GABAA receptors to be sensitive to the action of benzodiazepines they need to contain an α and a γ subunit, between which the benzodiazepine binds. Once bound, the benzodiazepine locks the GABAA receptor into a conformation where the neurotransmitter GABA has much higher affinity for the GABAA receptor, increasing the frequency of opening of the associated chloride ion channel and hyperpolarising the membrane. This potentiates the inhibitory effect of the available GABA leading to sedative and anxiolytic effects.

Different benzodiazepines have different affinities for GABAA receptors made up of different collection of subunits, and this means that their pharmacological profile varies with subtype selectivity. For instance, benzodiazepine receptor ligands with high activity at the α1 and/or α5 tend to be more associated with sedation, ataxia and amnesia, whereas those with higher activity at GABAA receptors containing α2 and/or α3 subunits generally have greater anxiolytic activity. Anticonvulsant effects can be produced by agonists acting at any of the GABAA subtypes, but current research in this area is focused mainly on producing α2-selective agonists as anticonvulsants which lack the side effects of older drugs such as sedation and amnesia.

The binding site for benzodiazepines is distinct from the binding site for barbiturates and GABA on the GABAA receptor, and also produces different effects on binding, with the benzodiazepines increasing the frequency of the chloride channel opening, while barbiturates increase the duration of chloride channel opening when GABA is bound. Since these are separate modulatory effects, they can both take place at the same time, and so the combination of benzodiazepines with barbiturates is strongly synergistic, and can be dangerous if dosage is not strictly controlled.

Also note that some GABAA agonists such as muscimol and gaboxadol do bind to the same site on the GABAA receptor complex as GABA itself, and consequently produce effects which are similar but not identical to those of positive allosteric modulators like benzodiazepines.

Structure and function

Structural understanding of the GABAA receptor was initially based on homology models, obtained using crystal structures of homologous proteins like Acetylcholine binding protein (AChBP) and nicotinic acetylcholine (nACh) receptors as templates. The much sought structure of a GABAA receptor was finally resolved, with the disclosure of the crystal structure of human β3 homopentameric GABAA  receptor.
Whilst this was a major development, the majority of GABAA receptors are heteromeric and the structure did not provide any details of the benzodiazepine binding site. This was finally elucidated in 2018 by the publication of a high resolution cryo-EM structure of rat α1β1γ2S receptor and human α1β2γ2 receptor bound with GABA and the neutral benzodiazepine flumazenil.

GABAA receptors are pentameric transmembrane receptors which consist of five subunits arranged around a central pore. Each subunit comprises four transmembrane domains with both the N- and C-terminus located extracellularly. The receptor sits in the membrane of its neuron, usually localized at a synapse, postsynaptically. However, some isoforms may be found extrasynaptically. When vesicles of GABA are released presynaptically and activate the GABA receptors at the synapse, this is known as phasic inhibition. However, the GABA escaping from the synaptic cleft can activate receptors on presynaptic terminals or at neighbouring synapses on the same or adjacent neurons (a phenomenon termed ‘spillover’) in addition to the constant, low GABA concentrations in the extracellular space results in persistent activation of the GABAA receptors known as tonic inhibition.

The ligand GABA is the endogenous compound that causes this receptor to open; once bound to GABA, the protein receptor changes conformation within the membrane, opening the pore in order to allow chloride anions (Cl−) and, to a lesser extent, bicarbonate ions (HCO3−) to pass down their electrochemical gradient. The binding site to GABA is about 80Å away from the narrowest part of the ion channel. Recent computational studies have suggested an allosteric mechanism whereby GABA binding leads to ion channel opening. Because the reversal potential for chloride in most mature neurons is close to or more negative than the resting membrane potential, activation of GABAA receptors tends to stabilize or hyperpolarise the resting potential, and can make it more difficult for excitatory neurotransmitters to depolarize the neuron and generate an action potential. The net effect therefore typically inhibitory, reducing the activity of the neuron, although depolarizing currents have been observed in response to GABA in immature neurons in early development. This effect during development is due to a modified Cl− gradient wherein the anions leave the cells through the GABAA receptors, since their intracellular chlorine concentration is higher than the extracellular. The difference in extracellular chlorine anion concentration is presumed to be due to the higher activity of chloride transporters, such as NKCC1, transporting chloride into cells which are present early in development, whereas, for instance, KCC2 transports chloride out cells and is the dominant factor in establishing the chloride gradient later in development. These depolarization events have shown to be key in neuronal development. In the mature neuron, the GABAA channel opens quickly and thus contributes to the early part of the inhibitory post-synaptic potential (IPSP).
The endogenous ligand that binds to the benzodiazepine site is inosine.

Subunits
GABAA receptors are members of the large pentameric ligand gated ion channel (previously referred to as "Cys-loop" receptors) super-family of evolutionarily related and structurally similar ligand-gated ion channels that also includes nicotinic acetylcholine receptors, glycine receptors, and the 5HT3 receptor. There are numerous subunit isoforms for the GABAA receptor, which determine the receptor's agonist affinity, chance of opening, conductance, and other properties.

In humans, the units are as follows:
 six types of α subunits (GABRA1, GABRA2, GABRA3, GABRA4, GABRA5, GABRA6)
 three βs (GABRB1, GABRB2, GABRB3)
 three γs (GABRG1, GABRG2, GABRG3)
 as well as a δ (GABRD), an ε (GABRE), a π (GABRP), and a θ (GABRQ)

There are three ρ units (GABRR1, GABRR2, GABRR3); however, these do not coassemble with the classical GABAA units listed above, but rather homooligomerize to form GABAA-ρ receptors (formerly classified as GABAC receptors but now this nomenclature has been deprecated).

Combinatorial Arrays 
Given the large number of GABAA receptors, a great diversity of final pentameric receptor subtypes is possible. Methods to produce cell-based laboratory access to a greater number of possible GABAA receptor subunit combinations allow teasing apart of the contribution of specific receptor subtypes and their physiological and pathophysiological function and role in the CNS and in disease.

Distribution 
GABAA receptors are responsible for most of the physiological activities of GABA in the central nervous system, and the receptor subtypes vary significantly. Subunit composition can vary widely between regions and subtypes may be associated with specific functions. The minimal requirement to produce a GABA-gated ion channel is the inclusion of an α and a β subunit. The most common GABAA receptor is a pentamer comprising two α's, two β's, and a γ (α2β2γ). In neurons themselves, the type of GABAA receptor subunits and their densities can vary between cell bodies and dendrites. GABAA receptors can also be found in other tissues, including leydig cells, placenta, immune cells, liver, bone growth plates and several other endocrine tissues. Subunit expression varies between 'normal' tissue and malignancies, as GABAA receptors can influence cell proliferation.

Ligands 

A number of ligands have been found to bind to various sites on the GABAA receptor complex and modulate it besides GABA itself. A ligand can possess one or more properties of the following types. Unfortunately the literature often does not distinguish these types properly.

Types 
 Orthosteric agonists and antagonists: bind to the main receptor site (the site where GABA normally binds, also referred to as the "active" or "orthosteric" site). Agonists activate the receptor, resulting in increased Cl− conductance. Antagonists, though they have no effect on their own, compete with GABA for binding and thereby inhibit its action, resulting in decreased Cl− conductance.
 First order allosteric modulators: bind to allosteric sites on the receptor complex and affect it either in a positive (PAM), negative (NAM) or neutral/silent (SAM) manner, causing increased or decreased efficiency of the main site and therefore an indirect increase or decrease in Cl− conductance. SAMs do not affect the conductance, but occupy the binding site.
 Second order modulators: bind to an allosteric site on the receptor complex and modulate the effect of first order modulators.
Open channel blockers: prolong ligand-receptor occupancy, activation kinetics and Cl ion flux in a subunit configuration-dependent and sensitization-state dependent manner.
 Non-competitive channel blockers: bind to or near the central pore of the receptor complex and directly block Cl− conductance through the ion channel.

Examples 
 Orthosteric agonists: GABA, gaboxadol, isoguvacine, muscimol, progabide, beta-alanine, taurine, piperidine-4-sulfonic acid (partial agonist).
 Orthosteric antagonists: bicuculline, gabazine.
 Positive allosteric modulators: barbiturates, benzodiazepines, certain carbamates (ex. carisoprodol, meprobamate, lorbamate), Honokiol, Magnolol, Baicalin, Baicelin, thienodiazepines, alcohol (ethanol), etomidate, glutethimide, kavalactones, meprobamate, quinazolinones (ex. methaqualone, etaqualone, diproqualone), neuroactive steroids, niacin/niacinamide, nonbenzodiazepines (ex. zolpidem, eszopiclone), propofol, stiripentol, theanine, valerenic acid, volatile/inhaled anesthetics, lanthanum, and riluzole.
 Negative allosteric modulators: flumazenil, Ro15-4513, sarmazenil, Pregnenolone sulfate, amentoflavone, and zinc.
 Inverse allosteric agonists: beta-carbolines (ex. Harmine, Harmaline, Tetrahydroharmine).
 Second-order modulators: (−)‐epigallocatechin‐3‐gallate.
 Non-competitive channel blockers: cicutoxin, oenanthotoxin, pentylenetetrazol, picrotoxin, thujone, and lindane.

Effects 
Ligands which contribute to receptor activation typically have anxiolytic, anticonvulsant, amnesic, sedative, hypnotic, euphoriant, and muscle relaxant properties. Some such as muscimol and the z-drugs may also be hallucinogenic. Ligands which decrease receptor activation usually have opposite effects, including anxiogenesis and convulsion. Some of the subtype-selective negative allosteric modulators such as α5IA are being investigated for their nootropic effects, as well as treatments for the unwanted side effects of other GABAergic drugs.

Novel drugs 
A useful property of the many benzodiazepine site allosteric modulators is that they may display selective binding to particular subsets of receptors comprising specific subunits. This allows one to determine which GABAA receptor subunit combinations are prevalent in particular brain areas and provides a clue as to which subunit combinations may be responsible for behavioral effects of drugs acting at GABAA receptors. These selective ligands may have pharmacological advantages in that they may allow dissociation of desired therapeutic effects from undesirable side effects. Few subtype selective ligands have gone into clinical use as yet, with the exception of zolpidem which is reasonably selective for α1, but several more selective compounds are in development such as the α3-selective drug adipiplon. There are many examples of subtype-selective compounds which are widely used in scientific research, including:
 CL-218,872 (highly α1-selective agonist)
 bretazenil (subtype-selective partial agonist)
 imidazenil and L-838,417 (both partial agonists at some subtypes, but weak antagonists at others)
 QH-ii-066 (full agonist highly selective for α5 subtype)
 α5IA (selective inverse agonist for α5 subtype)
 SL-651,498 (full agonist at α2 and α3 subtypes, and as a partial agonist at α1 and α5
 3-acyl-4-quinolones: selective for α1 over α3

Paradoxical reactions 
There are multiple indications that paradoxical reactions upon – for example – benzodiazepines,  barbiturates, inhalational anesthetics, propofol, neurosteroids, and alcohol are associated with structural deviations of GABAA receptors. The combination of the five subunits of the receptor (see images above) can be altered in such a way that for example the receptor's response to GABA remains unchanged but the response to one of the named substances is dramatically different from the normal one.

There are estimates that about 2–3 % of the general population may suffer from serious emotional disorders due to such receptor deviations, with up to 20% suffering from moderate disorders of this kind. It is generally assumed that the receptor alterations are, at least partly, due to genetic and also epigenetic deviations. There are indication that the latter may be triggered by, among other factors, social stress or occupational burnout.

See also 

 4-Iodopropofol
 GABA receptor
 GABAB receptor
 GABAA-ρ receptor
 Gephyrin
 Glycine receptor
 GABAA receptor positive allosteric modulators
 GABAA receptor negative allosteric modulators

References

Further reading

External links 
 

Transmembrane receptors
Ion channels
GABA